The Philippine tube-nosed fruit bat (Nyctimene rabori) locally known in Tagalog as Bayakan is a species of bat in the family Pteropodidae. It is endemic to the Philippines and known from the islands of Cebu, Negros and Sibuyan. It occurs in and near primary and secondary subtropical or tropical dry forests. It is often found near water.  The species is named for Dioscoro S. Rabor who, with several others, first collected the species.

Other common names of the species include Visayan tube-nosed fruit bat and Rabor's tube-nosed fruit bat.

Conservation
Nyctimene rabori is currently classified as endangered by the International Union for Conservation of Nature (IUCN). It is threatened by habitat loss due to deforestation.

See also

Giant golden-crowned flying fox
Philippine naked-backed fruit bat
IUCN Red List endangered species (Animalia)

References

Nyctimene (genus)
Mammals of the Philippines
Endemic fauna of the Philippines
Fauna of Cebu
Fauna of Negros Island
Fauna of Romblon
Mammals described in 1984
Taxonomy articles created by Polbot
Bats of Southeast Asia